The 2011 1000 km of Spa-Francorchamps was held at Circuit de Spa-Francorchamps on May 7, 2011.  It was the second round of the 2011 Le Mans Series season and the 2011 Intercontinental Le Mans Cup. Prior to the race weekend there were up to 60 provisional entries but was shortened to 54 as there were some withdrawals from Aston Martin Racing who withdrew to continue developing their new and struggling AMR-One. It was a similar situation for Hope Racing who were not quite ready to race the new KERS-driven Oreca 01 Hybrid. Other cars had to withdraw from damage prior to the weekend including the No. 24 OAK Racing Pescarolo 01 LMP1 car.

In the second free practice session of the race, the No. 13 Rebellion Racing Lola-Toyota driven by Jean-Christophe Boullion crashed heavily at Radillon corner. Then shortly after the green flag was waved to restart, the No. 8 Peugeot of Pedro Lamy and No. 36 RML Honda of Mike Newton collided with each other. Both Peugeot and Rebellion mechanics had to deal with a late night with the RML car too heavily damaged to take further part in the race weekend.

Qualifying
The qualifying session was stopped early when another heavy impact during the weekend halted proceedings. It was the remaining LMP1 car of OAK Racing that fell victim to the famous Spa-Francorchamps track. Matthieu Lahaye crashed heavily into a barrier resulting in much débris being put on the track. The session was red flagged and not restarted. This was bad news for Peugeot who decided to release their cars later on in the session but the red flags meant the two car only set one flying laps each. This resulted in the two cars No. 7 and 9 starting in 13th and 18th overall respectively, with the No. 8 Peugeot starting at the back of the grid for not participating in the qualifying session as it was still being repaired from the practice crash.

The No. 1 Audi driven by Timo Bernhard took pole position with No. 2 and 3 qualifying second and third respectively. Strakka Racing took LMP2 pole only marginally ahead of TDS Racing. In the FLM class, Phil Keen of Neil Garner Motorsport took pole for their car. The No. 71 AF Corse Ferrari starts first in the GTE Pro class while the No. 67 IMSA Matmut Porsche took pole in GTE Am.

Qualifying Result
Pole position winners in each class are marked in bold.

Race result
Class winners in bold.  Cars failing to complete 70% of winner's distance marked as Not Classified (NC).

References

Spa
6 Hours of Spa-Francorchamps
One Thousand km Spa
Spa